Fengtai Softball Field, or Fengtai Sports Center Softball Field, is a softball stadium located in Beijing, China. It hosted the softball competitions at the 2008 Summer Olympics.

The complex consists of two competition grounds and one training ground. The stadium has a capacity of 13,000 and a floor space of 15,570 square metres. It also has a backup field with a capacity of 3,500 and two training fields.

It was also one of the venues of the 1990 Asian Games and the 1992 Women's Softball World Cup.

The stadium's renovation was completed on July 28, 2006, ready for the XI ISF Women's World Championship in late August. It was the first Olympic venue in Beijing to be completed and put to use.

References
Beijing2008.cn profile.

Event venues with year of establishment missing
Venues of the 2008 Summer Olympics
Olympic softball venues
Sports venues in Beijing
Venues of the 1990 Asian Games
Asian Games baseball venues